is a metro station on the Toei Mita Line in Itabashi, Tokyo, Japan, operated by Toei Subway. It is located under Itabashi City Office, and the station name translates as "In front of Itabashi Ward Office".

Lines
Itabashikuyakushomae Station is served by the Toei Mita Line subway, and is numbered I-18.

Station layout
The station consists of two side platforms serving two tracks.

External links
 Itabashikuyakushomae Station information (Toei)

Railway stations in Japan opened in 1968
Railway stations in Tokyo
Toei Mita Line